Kaopectate is an orally taken medication from  Arcadia Consumer Healthcare for the treatment of mild diarrhea. It is also sometimes used to treat indigestion, nausea, and stomach ulcers. The active ingredients have varied over time, and are different between the United States and Canada. The original active ingredients were kaolinite and pectin. In the US, the active ingredient is now bismuth subsalicylate (the same as in Pepto-Bismol). In Switzerland, attapulgite is used.

Ingredients
The active ingredient in Kaopectate has changed since its original creation. Originally, kaolinite was used as the adsorbent and pectin as the emollient. Attapulgite (a type of absorbent clay) replaced the kaolinite in the 1980s, but was banned by the U.S. Food and Drug Administration in a ruling made in April 2003.  As a consequence, since 2004, bismuth subsalicylate has been used as the active ingredient in U.S. marketed products.  In Canada, McNeil Consumer Healthcare continues to market Kaopectate using attapulgite as the active ingredient. However, Kaopectate was recalled in July 2021 in Canada because it may contain arsenic and lead beyond acceptable limits.

As of 2020, the US rights to Kaopectate are owned by Arcadia Consumer Healthcare (formerly Kramer Laboratories).

Other animals

The U.S. Food and Drug Administration (FDA) does not have a clear stance on the administration of Kaopectate products on animals such as dogs and cats suffering from diarrhea. However, the Journal of the American Veterinary Medical Association Journal news article noted in 2003 that the new salicylate formulation might be harmful to cats. Kaolin-pectate, the original compound, was approved by the OTA (Organic Trade Association) for use in animals being produced for food.

Notes

External links

 

Antidiarrhoeals
Chattem